Bergen landdistrikt is a former municipality in the old Hordaland county in Norway. The municipality existed from 1838 until 1877 when it was merged into the neighboring city of Bergen.

History
The city of Bergen has been established for centuries.  From 1776 to 1789, the royal boundary surveying commission conducted a survey of the area to formally establish the boundaries of the city.  The areas that were left outside the city boundaries were still part of the local Domkirken and Holy Cross Church parishes.  The areas outside the city limits were referred to as the rural parishes of the city's churches.  The area south of the city was called the Domkirken landsogn and the area east of the city was the Korskirkens landsokn ("landsogn" means rural parish).  On 1 January 1838, all parishes in Norway were established as civil municipalities (see formannskapsdistrikt law). The two "rural parishes" of Bergen Cathedral and Holy Cross Church were merged to form the municipality called "Bergen landdistrikt". Initially, the new municipality had about 1500 residents.

In 1873, the city of Bergen requested that Parliament transfer Bergen landdistrikt to the city since a large part of the inhabitants of the rural parish worked in the city, and many of the city's businesses were located in Bergen landdistrikt.  The rural parish was against the merger, but the Parliament agreed with the city and Bergen landdistrikt was incorporated into Bergen on 1 January 1877.  There were 4,883 residents of the municipality at the time of its dissolution.  Upon the merger, the municipality was transferred to the city, but it also switched from Søndre Bergenhus county to Bergen county.

Mayors

See also
List of former municipalities of Norway

References

Geography of Bergen
Former municipalities of Norway
1838 establishments in Norway
1877 disestablishments in Norway